Francisco Cavalcanti Mangabeira (Salvador, 1879–1904) was a Brazilian  medical doctor and writer, brother of João Mangabeira and Otávio Mangabeira. He was volunteer in Canudos Campaign  as a medical student. Graduated as Medical Doctor in 1900. He took part in Salvador of the symbolist character movement New Crusade Group.  His poets work are the most valid within the atmosphere symbolist.

References

1879 births
1904 deaths
Brazilian male writers
People from Bahia